C19 is an untarred road in central Namibia. It starts in Solitaire, Namibia, forking off from the C14 road, and joins the B1 road on the outskirts of Mariental. The highway is 332 kilometres (206 mi) long. It has a junction with the C14 road at Maltahöhe.

References 

Roads in Namibia
Buildings and structures in Khomas Region
Buildings and structures in Hardap Region